Herman Carel Looman (8 November 1907 – December 1989) was a sailor from the Netherlands, who represented his native country as  at the 1936 Summer Olympics in Kiel. Looman, as crew member on the Dutch 6 Metre De Ruyter, took the 8th place with helmsman Joop Carp and fellow crew members: Ansco Dokkum, Ernst Moltzer and Kees Jonker.

Sources

External links
  

1907 births
1989 deaths
Sportspeople from Amsterdam
Dutch male sailors (sport)
Sailors at the 1936 Summer Olympics – 6 Metre
Olympic sailors of the Netherlands